was a politician and diplomat of the Federated States of Micronesia (FSM).

Born in Chuuk to a Japanese father and a native mother from Onoun, Nakayama was the younger brother of FSM's first president, Tosiwo Nakayama. In 1968, Nakayama was elected a member of the Truk District Legislature. In 1969, he was elected to the Congress of the Trust Territory of the Pacific Islands. After Micronesian independence, Nakayama was the Chief of International Affairs in the Foreign Affairs Department of the FSM from 1980 to 1989.

From 1989 to 1997, Nakayama was the ambassador of FSM to Japan. At the same time, he was concurrently the non-resident ambassador of FSM to China, Indonesia, Malaysia, South Korea and Singapore. In 1998, Nakayama was appointed the Permanent Representative of FSM to the United Nations in New York City.

Nakayama was married to Serlyn Nakayama, with seven children.

He died at the age of 70 in a Nevada hospital days after a stroke.

Notes

References 

 New Permanent Representative of Federated States of Micronesia Presents Credentials", UN Press Release, UN Doc. BIO/3147, 1998-03-13

1941 births
2011 deaths
People from Chuuk State
Ambassadors of the Federated States of Micronesia to Japan
Ambassadors of the Federated States of Micronesia to China
Ambassadors of the Federated States of Micronesia to Indonesia
Ambassadors of the Federated States of Micronesia to Malaysia
Ambassadors of the Federated States of Micronesia to South Korea
Ambassadors of the Federated States of Micronesia to Singapore
Permanent Representatives of the Federated States of Micronesia to the United Nations
Federated States of Micronesia diplomats
Federated States of Micronesia politicians of Japanese descent
Federated States of Micronesia politicians
Members of the Congress of the Trust Territory of the Pacific Islands